Balef Kola may refer to:
 Balef Kola-ye Gharbi
 Balef Kola-ye Sharqi